The zona pellucida (plural zonae pellucidae, also egg coat or pellucid zone) is a specialized extracellular matrix that surrounds the plasma membrane of mammalian oocytes. It is a vital constitutive part of the oocyte. The zona pellucida first appears in unilaminar primary oocytes. It is secreted by both the oocyte and the ovarian follicles. The zona pellucida is surrounded by the corona radiata. The corona is composed of cells that care for the egg when it is emitted from the ovary.

This structure binds spermatozoa, and is required to initiate the acrosome reaction. In the mouse (the best characterised mammalian system), the zona glycoprotein, ZP3, is responsible for sperm binding, adhering to proteins on the sperm plasma membrane.  ZP3 is then involved in the induction of the acrosome reaction, whereby a spermatozoon releases the contents of the acrosomal vesicle. The exact characterisation of what occurs in other species has become more complicated as further zona proteins have been identified.

In humans, five days after the fertilization, the blastocyst performs zona hatching; the zona pellucida degenerates and decomposes, to be replaced by the underlying layer of trophoblastic cells.
The zona pellucida is essential for oocyte growth and fertilization.

Structure
The zona pellucida is a translucent matrix of cross-linked glycoprotein filaments that surrounds the mammalian oocyte and is 6.5–20 μm thick depending on the species. Its formation, which depends on a conserved Zona pellucida-like (ZP) module that mediates the polymerization of egg coat components, is critical to successful fertilization. In non-mammals it is called the vitelline membrane or vitelline envelope.

Function
The thick membrane of the zona pellucida functions to only allow species-specific fertilization; to prevent polyspermy, and enable the acrosome reaction for the successful adhesion and penetration by the sperm cell. Also allows correct embryo development and size. The major glycoproteins of the egg coat responsible, are known as sperm-binding proteins.

The four major sperm-binding proteins, or sperm-receptors, are ZP1, ZP2, ZP3, and ZP4. They  bind to capacitated spermatozoa and induce the acrosome reaction. Successful fertilization depends on the ability of sperm to penetrate the extracellular matrix of the zona pellucida that surrounds the egg.
In the mouse:
 ZP3 allows species-specific sperm binding
 ZP2 mediates subsequent sperm binding
 ZP1 cross-links ZP2 and ZP3.

Data with native human protein are not currently available.

Immunocontraception

ZP module-containing glycoproteins ZP1, ZP2, ZP3 and ZP4 are targets for immunocontraception in mammals.

In non-mammals, the zona pellucida is called the vitelline membrane or envelope, and the vitelline envelope in insects, and plays an important role in preventing cross-breeding of different species, especially in species such as fish that fertilize outside of the body.

The zona pellucida is commonly used to control wildlife population problems by immunocontraception. When the zona pellucida of one animal species is injected into the bloodstream of another, it results in sterility of the second species due to immune response. This effect can be temporary or permanent, depending on the method used. In New Jersey, immunocontraception using porcine zona pellucida has been trialled for the control of deer.

Additional images

References

Further reading
 
 
 
 Bagnell C (2005). "Animal Reproduction". Rutgers University Department of Animal Sciences.

External links
  - "Female Reproductive System: ovary, cumulus oophorus "
  - "Female Reproductive System: ovary, multilaminar primary follicle"
  - "Mammal, canine ovary (LM, High)"
 Image at um.edu.mt
 Image at um.edu.mt

Germ cell structures
Reproductive system
Vertebrate developmental biology